Bröbberow is a municipality  in the district of Rostock, in Mecklenburg, Germany, consisting of the three villages Bröbberow, Klein Grenz and Groß Grenz.

References